The 2015 Nashville mayoral election took place on August 6, 2015, to elect the Mayor of Nashville, Tennessee. As no candidate won a majority of the vote, a runoff was held on September 10 between the top two candidates.

Nashville elections are officially nonpartisan.

Incumbent Democratic Mayor Karl Dean was term limited and could not run for re-election to a third term in office.

Election results

First round

Runoff
No candidates received the required majority for election, therefore a runoff election took place on September 10, 2015 between the two candidates receiving the most votes, Megan Barry and David Fox.

Candidates

Declared
 Megan Barry, Metropolitan Councilmember
 Charles Robert Bone, attorney and businessman
 Bobby Bones, National Radio Personality
 David Fox, former Chairman of the Metropolitan Nashville Public Schools Board
 Bill Freeman, real estate executive, former Treasurer of the Tennessee Democratic Party and former Director of Development for the Nashville Metropolitan Development and Housing Agency
 Howard Gentry, Davidson County Criminal Court Clerk, former Vice Mayor and candidate for Mayor in 2007
 Jeremy Kane, charter school founder
 Linda Eskind Rebrovick, businesswoman
 Chad Riden, comedian

Potential
 Stuart Brunson, former Deputy Governor of Tennessee
 Butch Eley, businessman
 Frank Garrison, businessman
 Jason Holleman, Metropolitan Councilmember
 Ronnie Steine, Metropolitan Councilmember and former Vice Mayor
 Carter Todd, Metropolitan Councilmember
 Mike Turner, state representative

Declined
 Daron Hall, Davidson County Sheriff
 Torry Johnson, Davidson County District Attorney
 Jerry Maynard, Metropolitan Councilmember
 Diane Neighbors, Vice Mayor of Nashville and former Metropolitan Councilmember
 Bill Purcell, former Mayor
 Ralph Schulz, President and CEO of the Nashville Area Chamber of Commerce
 Jeff Yarbro, state senator

References

2015 Tennessee elections
2015 United States mayoral elections
2015
August 2015 events in the United States